Alfred James Ewart, FRS  (12 February 1872 – 12 September 1937) was an English-Australian botanist.

Early life and education 
Ewart was born in Toxteth Park, Liverpool, England, second son of Edmund Brown Ewart, B.A. and his wife, Martha née Williams. He was educated at the Liverpool Institute and University College, Liverpool, then graduated with a Ph.D. from Leipzig University and D.Sc. from Oxford.

Career 
Ewart was a demonstrator of botany at Liverpool, and subsequently Science Master at King Edward's School, Birmingham, and lecturer on botany at Birmingham University, where he was for a time deputy professor.

In 1905 Ewart was appointed Professor of Botany at the University of Melbourne. He had already completed a laborious and useful piece of work, his translation of Wilhelm Pfeffer's treatise on The Physiology of Plants, the first volume of which was published in 1900, the second in 1903, and the third in 1906. He had also published First Stage Botany (1900), New Matriculation Botany (1902), of which many impressions were subsequently published under the title Ewart's Elementary Botany; On the Physics and Physiology of Protoplasmic Streaming in Plants (1903), and Rural Calendar (1905).

In 1906, Ewart became the foundation chair of botany and plant physiology at the University of Melbourne. For the next 15 years Ewart was also the government botanist. In 1909, in collaboration with James Richard Tovey, who conducted the field research, he published a useful work on The Weeds, Poison Plants and Naturalized Aliens of Victoria, and in 1917, in collaboration with Miss Olive B. Davies. The Flora of the Northern Territory.

At the university Ewart had no separate building and for many years shared the biology school building with Sir Baldwin Spencer. After World War I a separate department for botany was built.

In 1927 Ewart was asked by the government to prepare a new Flora of Victoria which, with some assistance from other scientists, was completed and published in 1930. Other works not already mentioned include a Handbook of Forest Trees for Victorian Foresters (1925), and many papers in scientific journals, some of which were reprinted as pamphlets.

Ewart was elected a Fellow of the Royal Society in 1922. Ewart was president of Section D (Biology) of the Australasian Association for the Advancement of Science meeting in Melbourne in 1921, and of Section M (Botany) at Perth in 1926.

Personal 
Ewart married twice, firstly to Florence Maud Donaldson, a violinist and composer of ability, in 1898 and secondly to Elizabeth Bilton in 1931. There were two sons of the first marriage. Ewart died suddenly on 12 September 1937.

References

Bibliography

T. C. Chambers, 'Ewart, Alfred James (1872 - 1937)', Australian Dictionary of Biography, Volume 8, MUP, 1981, pp 448–450. Retrieved on 17 October 2008.

1872 births
1937 deaths
People from Toxteth
19th-century British botanists
English emigrants to Australia
20th-century Australian botanists
Botanists active in Australia
Fellows of the Royal Society
Leipzig University alumni
Academic staff of the University of Melbourne
Scientists from Liverpool
People educated at Liverpool Institute High School for Boys